Tonna variegata, commonly known as the variegated tun, is a species of marine gastropod mollusc in the family Tonnidae (also known as the tun shells).

The forma Tonna variegata f. dunkeri (Hanley, 1860) is a synonym of Tonna dunkeri (Hanley, 1860)

Description
The size of the shell varies between 70 mm and 200mm.

The thin shell has an ovate-globose, ventricose shape. The spire is composed of six convex whorls, slightly separated by a shallow suture, and loaded with transverse rounded ribs, which are very approximate. The body whorl composes, itself, almost the whole of the shell. Twenty to twenty-six transverse ribs may be counted upon its surface, among which, in old specimens, are found other smaller ones which are alternately disposed between the first, towards the most elevated part. All the ribs are separated by furrows which are not throughout of the same size. The aperture is wide, large and ovate. Its lips are white, and the interior reddish. The outer lip, terminated by a scolloped dilatation, is traversed by a canal of no great depth. The inner lip is white, thin, applied to the body of the body whorl and forms a part of the umbilicus. The columella is twisted spirally. The coloring of the exterior is whitish, varied with red, and covered, upon the transverse ribs, with irregular spots which sometimes form longitudinal or zigzag bands of a deeper color. Upon some specimens are observed ribs which have no other tint of coloring than the ground of the shell. Young specimens are diaphanous and slightly colored by spots. The periostracum is thin and reddish.<ref name="Kiener">Kiener (1840). General species and iconography of recent shells : comprising the Massena Museum, the collection of Lamarck, the collection of the Museum of Natural History, and the recent discoveries of travellers; Boston :W.D. Ticknor,1837 (described as 'Dolium variegatum)</ref>

Distribution
This marine species occurs off South and Southeast Africa; off New Zealand and off Australia (Western Australia).

References

 Lamarck, J.B.P.A. de M. 1822. Histoire Naturelle des Animaux sans Vertèbres. Suite des Gastéropodes. Paris : J.B. Lamarck Vol. 6(2) 232 pp.
 Philippi, R.A. 1847. Abbildungen und Beschriebungen neuer oder wenig gekannter Conchylien. Cassel : Theodor Fischer Vol. 3 pp. 1–50. 
 Hanley, S. 1860. Systematic list of the species of Dolium restricted. Proceedings of the Zoological Society of London 27: 487-493
 Hedley, C. 1919. A review of the Australian Tun Shells. Records of the Australian Museum 12(11): 329-336, pls 39-44 
 Kilias, R. 1962. Gastropoda/Prosobranchia. Tonnidae. Das Tierreich 77: 1-63 [
 Wilson, B. 1993. Australian Marine Shells. Prosobranch Gastropods. Kallaroo, Western Australia : Odyssey Publishing Vol. 1 408 pp.
 Wilson, B. 2002. A handbook to Australian seashells on seashores east to west and north to south. Sydney : Reed New Holland 185 pp.
 Vos, C. 2005. Notes on Tonnidae of the T. variegata complex and T. chinensis complex, with descriptions of four new species (Gastropoda: Tonnidae). Visaya 1(5): 45-54
 Vos, C. & Terryn, Y. in Poppe, G.T. & Groh, K. (eds) 2007. A Conchological Iconography. The family Tonnidae.'' Hackenheim, Germany : ConchBooks pp. 1–121, 63 pls.

External links
 Gastropods.com: Tonna (Variegata complex) variegata

Tonnidae
Gastropods described in 1758
Taxa named by Carl Linnaeus